Belpre may refer to a place in the United States:

 Belpre, Kansas
 Belpre, Ohio
 Belpre Township, Washington County, Ohio